The NCAA transfer portal is a National Collegiate Athletic Association (NCAA) application, database, and compliance tool launched on October 15, 2018, to manage and facilitate the process for student athletes seeking to transfer between member institutions. The transfer portal permits student athletes to place their name in an online database declaring their desire to transfer. Athletes enter the portal by informing their current school of their desire to transfer; the school then has two business days to enter the athlete's name in the database. Once an athlete's name is entered in the database, coaches and staff from other schools are permitted to make contact with the athlete to inquire about their interest in visiting the campus and accepting a scholarship.  The transfer portal is intended to bring greater transparency to the transfer process and to enable student athletes to publicize their desire to transfer. The transfer portal is an NCAA-wide database, covering transfers in all three NCAA divisions, although most media coverage of the transfer portal involves its use in the top-level Division I.

New regulations were adopted in 2021 allowing student-athletes in Division I football, men's and women's basketball, men's ice hockey, and baseball to change schools using the portal once without sitting out a year after the transfer. This regulation placed all NCAA sports under the same transfer rules, as the so-called "one-time transfer" rule had long been in place for all other D-I sports, as well as all sports in Divisions II and III.

Transfer windows
On August 31, 2022, the Division I board adopted a series of changes to transfer rules, introducing the concept of transfer windows, similar to those used in professional soccer worldwide. Student-athletes who wish to take advantage of the one-time transfer rule now must, under normal circumstances, enter the portal within a designated window for their sport. These windows are slightly different for each NCAA sport, but are broadly grouped by the NCAA's three athletic "seasons".
 Fall sports – A 45-day winter window opening the day after championship selections are made in that sport, and a spring window from May 1–15. According to the NCAA, "reasonable accommodations" would be made for participants in football's FBS and FCS championship games (respectively the College Football Playoff National Championship and Division I Football Championship Game), both of which take place in early January. More specifically, participants in those games have a 14-day window opening on the day after the championship game, as well as the spring window.
 Winter sports – A 60-day window opening the day after championship selections are made in that sport.
 Spring sports – A winter window from December 1–15, and a 45-day spring window opening the day after championship selections are made in that sport.
 For sports included in the NCAA Emerging Sports for Women program, transfer windows are the same as those for fully recognized NCAA sports. As with fully recognized NCAA sports, transfer windows linked to championship events open on the day after selections are made for the generally recognized championship events in emerging sports.

Student-athletes whose athletic aid is reduced, canceled, or not renewed by their current school may enter the transfer portal at any time without penalty. This exception also applies to those undergoing a head coaching change.

Less than a month after transfer windows were adopted, the Division I Council adopted a change that affects only graduate transfers. Student-athletes who are set to graduate with remaining athletic eligibility, and plan to continue competition as postgraduate students, are exempt from transfer windows. They may enter the portal at any time during the academic year, subject only to deadlines of May 1 for fall and winter sports and July 1 for spring sports.

Because the Ivy League allows neither redshirting nor athletic participation by graduate students, athletes at its member schools who are set to complete four years of attendance but still have remaining athletic eligibility may enter the portal at any time during their fourth academic year of attendance.

Notable athletes using the portal

This section is limited to notable athletes who have used the transfer portal to change schools. The lists are limited to athletes who have Wikipedia articles about them.

Football 2021–22
The following football players used the transfer portal during the 2021–22 window:
 Jordan Addison, wide receiver, Pittsburgh to USC
 Jahleel Billingsley, tight end, Alabama to Texas
 Jermaine Burton, wide receiver, Georgia to Alabama
 Jaxson Dart, quarterback, USC to Ole Miss
 Zach Evans, running back, TCU to Ole Miss
 Quinn Ewers, quarterback, Ohio State to Texas
 Dillon Gabriel, quarterback, UCF to Oklahoma
 Eric Gentry, linebacker, Arizona State to USC
 Jahmyr Gibbs, running back, Georgia Tech to Alabama
 Brandon Joseph, safety, Northwestern to Notre Dame
 Ochaun Mathis, defensive end, TCU to Nebraska
 Isaiah Neyor, wide receiver, Wyoming to Texas
 Eyabi Okie, defensive end, UT Martin to Michigan
 Olusegun Oluwatimi, center, Virginia to Michigan, 2022 Outland Trophy and Rimington Trophy winner
 Michael Penix Jr., quarterback, Indiana to Washington
 John Rhys Plumlee, quarterback, Ole Miss to UCF
 Spencer Rattler, quarterback, Oklahoma to South Carolina
 Eli Ricks, cornerback, LSU to Alabama
 Drew Sanders, linebacker, Alabama to Arkansas
 Lindsey Scott Jr., quarterback, Nicholls to Incarnate Word, 2022 Walter Payton Award winner
 Casey Thompson, quarterback, Texas to Nebraska 
 Kyle Vantrease, quarterback, Buffalo to Georgia Southern
 Jared Verse, defensive end, Albany to Florida State
 Cameron Ward, quarterback, Incarnate Word to Washington State
 Caleb Williams, quarterback, Oklahoma to USC, 2022 Heisman Trophy winner
 Mario Williams, wide receiver, Oklahoma to USC

Basketball 2022–23
The following basketball players used the transfer portal during the 2022–23 window:

Men 
 Fardaws Aimaq, center, Utah Valley to Texas Tech
 Devin Askew, point guard/shooting guard, Texas to California
 Emoni Bates, small forward/shooting guard, Memphis to Eastern Michigan
 Keion Brooks Jr., small forward/power forward, Kentucky to Washington
 Johni Broome, power forward/center, Morehead State to Auburn
 André Curbelo, point guard, Illinois to St. John's
 Kendric Davis, point guard, SMU to Memphis
 Doug Edert, point guard, Saint Peter's to Bryant
 De'Vion Harmon, point guard, Oregon to Texas Tech
 Tyrese Hunter, point guard, Iowa State to Texas
 Kyle Lofton, point guard, St. Bonaventure to Florida
 Matthew Mayer, shooting guard/small forward, Baylor to Illinois
 Kevin McCullar, shooting guard, Texas Tech to Kansas
 Tre Mitchell, power forward/center, Texas to West Virginia
 Isiaih Mosley, shooting guard/small forward, Missouri State to Missouri
 Pete Nance, power forward, Northwestern to North Carolina
 KC Ndefo, power forward, Saint Peter's to Seton Hall
 Norchad Omier, small forward/power forward, Arkansas State to Miami (FL)
 Osun Osunniyi, power forward/center, St. Bonaventure to Iowa State
 Nijel Pack, point guard, Kansas State to Miami (FL)
 Courtney Ramey, point guard, Texas to Arizona
 Efton Reid, power forward/center, LSU to Gonzaga
 Baylor Scheierman, shooting guard, South Dakota State to Creighton
 Mark Sears, point guard, Ohio to Alabama
 Terrence Shannon Jr., shooting guard/small forward, Texas Tech to Illinois
 Grant Sherfield, point guard, Nevada to Oklahoma
 Malachi Smith, shooting guard, Chattanooga to Gonzaga
 KJ Williams, power forward, Murray State to LSU

Women 
 Haley Cavinder, point guard, Fresno State to Miami (FL)
 Shaylee Gonzales, point guard/shooting guard, BYU to Texas
 Rickea Jackson, forward, Mississippi State to Tennessee
 Lou Lopez Sénéchal, forward, Fairfield to UConn
 Ashley Owusu, shooting guard, Maryland to Virginia Tech
 Angel Reese, power forward, Maryland to LSU

Football 2022–23

Top 25

The following football players are ranked by 247Sports as the top 30 recruits entering the transfer portal during the 2022–23 window. Players who did not change schools are highlighted in blue.

Others
 Brennan Armstrong, quarterback, Virginia to NC State
 Hank Bachmeier, quarterback, Boise State to Louisiana Tech
 JT Daniels, quarterback, West Virginia to Rice
 CJ Dippre, tight end, Maryland to Alabama
 Tony Grimes, cornerback, North Carolina to Texas A&M
 Sam Hartman, quarterback, Wake Forest to Notre Dame
 Traeshon Holden, wide receiver, Alabama to Oregon
 Emory Jones, quarterback, Arizona State to Cincinnati
 Phil Jurkovec, quarterback, Boston College to Pittsburgh 
 Haynes King, quarterback, Texas A&M to Georgia Tech
 Cade McNamara, quarterback, Michigan to Iowa
 Graham Mertz, quarterback, Wisconsin to Florida
 Tanner Mordecai, quarterback, SMU to Wisconsin
 Drew Pyne, quarterback, Notre Dame to Arizona State
 Austin Reed, quarterback, entered the portal but ultimately remained at Western Kentucky.
 Spencer Sanders, quarterback, Oklahoma State to Ole Miss
 Jeff Sims, quarterback, Georgia Tech to Nebraska
 Kedon Slovis, quarterback, Pittsburgh to BYU
 Donovan Smith, quarterback, Texas Tech to Houston
 Jake Smith, wide receiver, USC to Arizona State
 Carson Steele, running back, Ball State to UCLA
 Austin Stogner, tight end, South Carolina to Oklahoma

Footnotes

References

National Collegiate Athletic Association